Henry Douglas Robinson (15 March 1859 - 18 December 1913) was missionary bishop of the Episcopal Diocese of Nevada.

Education and career
Robinson was born on March 15, 1859, in Lowell, Massachusetts, the son of Alexander Douglas and Clara Boate. He graduated from Racine College with a bachelor of Arts in 1884 and with a Master of Arts in 1887. in 1902 he also earned his Doctor of Divinity from the same college. He was an instructor of mathematics in San Mateo, California Military Academy between 1885 and 1889 and served as Headmaster between 1889 and 1900. In 1900 he became warden of Racine College. He was ordained deacon in 1886 and priest in 1888.

Bishop
In 1907, Robinson was elected as Missionary Bishop of Nevada. He was consecrated on March 25, 1908, by Presiding Bishop Daniel S. Tuttle in St Luke's Church in Racine, Wisconsin. He was also a bishop associate of the Confraternity of the Blessed Sacrament.

References
Obituary, The Living Church, December 27, 1913, p. 303

1859 births
1913 deaths
Racine College alumni
19th-century American Episcopalians
Episcopal bishops of Nevada